Opened on 28 September 1936, Hersham railway station is on the London to Woking line and operated by South Western Railway.

Services
At off-peak times during weekdays are two trains per hour (tph) to London Waterloo and two tph to Woking, a large town and junction station in Surrey.  During morning rush hour there are an extra two trains per hour to London Waterloo, and in the evening, south-west bound these continue to Guildford.

Immediate surroundings
Entrance to the station is from either side of the railway bridge which is above street level.  The station entrances are at the southern end of each platform, and at the western end (furthest from London).  The station has ticket machines and an office open until 1.40 pm. The main line towards Woking and Basingstoke consists of four tracks here, but only the outer tracks have platforms, served by stopping services to/from Woking.

Bus routes 514 and 564 serve the station, stopping at nearby bus stops on Molesey Road.

It is one of two stations serving Walton on Thames and Hersham as its railway track and engineered line beneath it mark the divide between the two settlements.  Adjoining to one side are housing (west) and fields with a golf course next to the River Mole (east).

Notes

References

Railway stations in Surrey
Former Southern Railway (UK) stations
Railway stations in Great Britain opened in 1936
Railway stations served by South Western Railway
1936 establishments in England
Borough of Elmbridge